Charles Bridault (Paris, 1830 – 1896) was a 19th-century French playwright. His plays were given on the most significant Parisian stages of his time including the Théâtre des Folies-Nouvelles, and the Théâtre Saint-Germain.

Personal life
A General Secretary of the Théâtre de l'Odéon, then journalist by Le Figaro, he became managing director of the théâtre Tour-d'Auvergne from 1871.

Works 
1853: Mort et remords ou les inconvénients d'assassiner un marchand d'habits grêlé, with Paul Legrand
1854: Les Succès de l'année, rondeau
1854: Pierrot Dandin, pantomime in five tableaux
1855: La Fausse douairière, pantomime in two tableaux, with Legrand
1855: Les Jolis chasseurs, hallali musical
1856: Le quinze novembre, with Henri Larochelle
1857: La Naïade, ballet-pantomime in two acts, mingled with songs
1857: Nella, ballet-pantomime mingled with choirs
1858: Fra Diavolino, operetta in one act, with Amédée de Jallais
1858: La Recherche de l'inconnu, operetta in one act, with Sylvain Mangeant
1858: Le Roi de la gaudriole, operetta in one act, with de Jallais and Alexandre Flan
1859: Monsieur Deschalumeaux, opéra-bouffon (after Auguste***), arranged in two tableaux
1861: Je suis né coiffé, folie vaudeville in one act, with Édouard Montagne
1864: Un Maestro de bourgade, opera comique in one act
1866: L'Echappé de province, play in three acts, mingled with song
1867: Point d'Angleterre, comedy in one act, with Paul Siraudin
1874: Ah! C'est donc toi MMe la Revue !, revue in three acts and ten tableaux, with Hector Monreal and Henry Blondeau

Bibliography 
 Émile Abraham, Les acteurs et les actrices de Paris: biographie complète, 1861, (p. 101)
 Jean Valmy-Baysse, La curieuse aventure des boulevards extérieurs (1786-1950), 1950, (p. 320)

References 

19th-century French dramatists and playwrights
1830 births
Writers from Paris
1896 deaths